The 2015 Fayetteville mayoral election took place on November 3, 2015 to elect the mayor of Fayetteville, North Carolina. It saw the reelection of incumbent mayor Nat Robertson.

Results

Primary
The primary was held October 6, 2015.

General election

References

2015
2015 North Carolina elections
2015 United States mayoral elections